Gaetano Gorgoni (26 August 1933 – 13 May 2020) was an Italian politician who served as a Deputy.

References

2020 deaths
Italian politicians
1933 births